Ten-star household (十星級文明家庭) is a status awarded to households in rural China that exemplify all of the virtues of modern Chinese society. In some regions, this brings with it free utilities, healthcare, education, and even groceries.

Society of China